Benjamin Levin may refer to:
Benjamin Levin (academic) (born 1952), Canadian academic, civil servant, and convicted child pornographer
Benjamin Levin (musician) (born 1988), American rapper, songwriter and record producer performing as Benny Blanco
Benjamin Levin (partisan) (1927–2020), Lithuanian resistance fighter

See also
 Ben Levin (disambiguation)